, formal rank designations:  was the highest rank in the prewar Imperial Japanese Navy. The term  was used for both the navy and the Imperial Japanese Army, and was a largely honorific title awarded for extremely meritorious service to the Emperor. In the Meiji period, the title was awarded to five generals and three admirals. In the Taishō period it was awarded to six generals and six admirals, and in the Shōwa period it was awarded to six generals and four admirals. Equivalent to a five-star rank (OF-10), it is similar to Admiral of the Fleet in the Royal Navy and Fleet admiral in the United States Navy.

List of Kaigun-gensui
Note that several were promoted the same year they died; these were posthumous promotions.

See also

Gensui (Imperial Japanese Army)
Imperial Japanese Navy
Grand admiral

References

Japanese

Military ranks of Japan
ja:元帥 (日本)